Hybrid Theory is the debut studio album by American rock band Linkin Park, released on October 24, 2000, through Warner Bros. Records. Recorded at NRG Recordings in North Hollywood, California, and produced by Don Gilmore, the album's lyrical themes deal with problems lead vocalist Chester Bennington experienced during his adolescence, including drug abuse and the constant fighting and divorce of his parents. Hybrid Theory takes its title from the previous name of the band as well as the concept of music theory and combining different styles. This is also the only album on which bassist Dave Farrell does not play.

Four singles were released from Hybrid Theory: "One Step Closer", "In the End", "Crawling" and "Papercut", all of them being responsible for launching Linkin Park into mainstream popularity. While "In the End" was the most successful of the four, all of the singles in the album remain some of the band's most successful songs to date. Although "Runaway", "Points of Authority", and "My December" from the special edition bonus disc album were not released as singles, they were minor hits on alternative rock radio stations thanks to the success of all of the band's singles and the album; "Runaway" has also made several appearances on radio stations.

Generally receiving positive reviews from critics upon its release, Hybrid Theory became a strong commercial success. Peaking at number two on the US Billboard 200, it is certified 12× Platinum by the Recording Industry Association of America (RIAA). It also reached the top 10 in 15 other countries and has sold 32 million copies worldwide, making it the best-selling debut album since Guns N' Roses's Appetite for Destruction (1987) and the best-selling rock album of the 21st century. At the 44th Grammy Awards, it won Best Hard Rock Performance for "Crawling".

In 2002, Linkin Park released the remix album Reanimation. It included the songs of Hybrid Theory remixed and reinterpreted by nu metal and underground hip hop artists. Contributors to the album included Black Thought, Pharoahe Monch, Jonathan Davis, Stephen Carpenter, and Aaron Lewis. The sound of later Linkin Park albums would involve experimentation with classical instruments such as strings and piano, both of which, along with the same elements of electronica from Hybrid Theory, are prominently included in the band's second studio album, Meteora.

On August 13, 2020, Warner Records announced a re-release of Hybrid Theory for its 20th anniversary. A previously unreleased demo song, "She Couldn't", was put out at the same time.

Background

Linkin Park was founded in 1996 as the rap rock band Xero: lead guitarist Brad Delson, vocalist and rhythm guitarist Mike Shinoda, drummer Rob Bourdon, turntablist Joe Hahn, lead vocalist Mark Wakefield and bassist Dave Farrell (who subsequently left to tour with Tasty Snax). In 1999, after Wakefield's departure, lead vocalist Chester Bennington joined the five members of Xero and the band was renamed Hybrid Theory. Bennington's previous band, Grey Daze, had recently disbanded, so his lawyer recommended him to Jeff Blue, vice president of A&R coordination for Zomba, who at the time was seeking a lead vocalist for Xero. Blue sent Bennington two tapes of Xero's unreleased recordings — one with vocals by former Xero member Mark Wakefield, and the other with only the instrumental tracks — asking for his "interpretation of the songs". Bennington wrote and recorded new vocals over the instrumentals and sent the tapes back to Blue. As Delson recalls, "[Bennington] really was kind of the final piece of the puzzle [...] We didn't see anything close to his talent in anybody else." After Bennington joined, the group first renamed itself to Hybrid Theory and released a self-titled EP. Legal complications with Welsh electronic music group Hybrid prompted a second name change, thus deciding on "Linkin Park". Throughout 1999, Linkin Park was a regular act at the Los Angeles club, The Whisky.

Writing and recording
The music that would ultimately become the Hybrid Theory album was first produced by Linkin Park in 1999 as a nine-track demo tape. The band sent this tape to various recording companies and played forty-two different showcases for recording industry representatives, including performances for Los Angeles promoter and impresario, Mike Galaxy's showcase at The Gig on Melrose. However, they were initially turned down by most of the major labels and several independent record labels. The band was signed by Warner Bros. Records in 1999, due in large part to the constant recommendations of Jeff Blue, who had joined the label after resigning from Zomba.

Despite initial difficulties in finding a producer willing to take charge of the debut album of a newly signed band, Don Gilmore ultimately agreed to head up the project, with Andy Wallace hired as the mixer. Recording sessions, which mostly involved re-recording the songs off the demo tape, began at NRG Recordings in North Hollywood, California in March 2000 and lasted four months. Shinoda's rapping sections in most of the songs were significantly altered from the original, while most choruses remained largely unchanged. Due to the absence of Dave Farrell and Kyle Christener, who took part in the 1999 extended play, the band hired Scott Koziol and Ian Hornbeck as stand-in bassists; Delson also played bass throughout most of the album. The Dust Brothers provided additional beats for the track "With You".

Bennington and Shinoda wrote the lyrics of Hybrid Theory based in part on early demos with Mark Wakefield. Shinoda characterized the lyrics as interpretations of universal feelings, emotions, and experiences, and as "everyday emotions you talk about and think about." Bennington later described the songwriting experience to Rolling Stone in early 2002:

Composition
The music of Hybrid Theory draws from diverse inspirations. Bennington's singing style is influenced by acts such as Depeche Mode and Stone Temple Pilots, while the riffs and playing techniques of guitarist Brad Delson are modeled after Deftones, Guns N' Roses, U2, and The Smiths. The lyrical content of the songs primarily touches upon the problems that Bennington encountered during his childhood, including constant and excessive drug and alcohol abuse, the divorce of his parents, isolation, disappointments, and the aftermath feelings of failed relationships. Stylistically, the album has been described as nu metal, rap metal, rap rock, alternative metal, alternative rock, and hard rock.

The album eventually produced four singles. "One Step Closer", the album's second track and first single, was gradually recorded in increments after Linkin Park struggled with "Runaway", and features a guitar riff and electronic percussion in the introduction transitioning into a bridge with distortion-heavy guitars and aggressive drums. It is also famous for the "Shut up when I'm talkin' to you!" refrain screamed by Bennington one minute and 48 seconds into the song. The music video for "One Step Closer" was shot in a Los Angeles subway and became an instant hit, eventually receiving heavy rotation on MTV and other music television networks. Stand-in bassist Scott Koziol is shown performing with the band in the video.

The second single was "Crawling", which Bennington described as "about feeling like I had no control over myself in terms of drugs and alcohol."

"Papercut" was the album's third single, and its lyrics describe paranoia. The music video for "Papercut" features the band performing in a hallway opposite a completely dark room on the walls of which are scribbled the song's lyrics. Various supernatural themes are present in the video, and special effects are used to create eerie renditions, such as the "stretching" of Shinoda's fingers and the "melting" of Bourdon's face.

The fourth and final single to come from Hybrid Theory was "In the End", released on October 9, 2001. The song prominently features a signature piano riff performed by Shinoda. His rapping also dominates the verses of the song and is later joined by Bennington's vocals in the chorus. The music video for "In the End" was shot at various stops along the 2001 Ozzfest tour and was directed by Nathan "Karma" Cox and the band's DJ Joe Hahn, who would go on to direct many of Linkin Park's future videos (the two also directed the music video for "Papercut"). Although the background for the "In the End" video was filmed in a California desert, the band itself performed on a studio stage in Los Angeles, with prominent CGI effects and compositing being used to create the finished version. Performing on a studio stage allowed Hahn and Cox to set off water pipes above the stage near the end and drench the band.
The music video won the Best Rock Video award at the 2002 MTV Video Music Awards.

"Points of Authority", the fourth track on the album, has its own music video that can be found on Frat Party at the Pankake Festival, the band's first DVD. Drummer Rob Bourdon describes the recording process of the song: "Brad wrote this riff, then went home. Mike decided to cut it up into different pieces and rearranged them on the computer [...] Brad had to learn his own part from the computer." Regarding the song, Delson praised Shinoda's skill, describing him as "a genius" and "Trent Reznor-talented". On live performances of the song, when Shinoda raps the line, "Forfeit the game" verse for the third time in the song, Bennington would rap the verse along with Mike.

Artwork
With Hybrid Theory being Linkin Park's first album, Mike Shinoda, who had worked as a graphic designer before becoming a professional musician, has stated that the band had looked through books for inspiration on how to present themselves for the first time. The result was a winged-soldier which Shinoda illustrated himself. According to Chester Bennington, the idea of the soldier with dragonfly wings was to describe the blending of hard and soft musical elements by the use of the jaded looks of the soldier and frail touches of the wings. The art style was largely influenced by stencil graffiti, including early works by Banksy. The cover also features scrambled lyrics of the album's songs within the background, though the lyrics of "One Step Closer" are the most prominent.

Tours
Following the success of Hybrid Theory, Linkin Park received invitations to perform at various rock concerts and tours, including Ozzfest, the Family Values Tour, KROQ-FM's Almost Acoustic Christmas, and the band's self-created tour, Projekt Revolution, which was headlined by Linkin Park and featured other bands such as Cypress Hill and Adema. During this time, Linkin Park reunited with their original bassist, Dave "Phoenix" Farrell. The band kept an online journal on their official website throughout their 2001 and 2002 touring regime, in which each band member made a respective notation. Although the notes are no longer on their website, they are available on fansites. Linkin Park played 324 shows in 2001.

Reception

Critical reception

Hybrid Theory received generally positive reviews from critics. Mike Ross of Jam! praised the album as an effective fusion of hip hop and heavy metal music and deemed Linkin Park "one of the finest new rap metal bands". PopMatters reviewer Stephanie Dickison wrote that they are "a far more complex and talented group than the hard rock boy bands of late" and "will continue to fascinate and challenge music's standard sounds." In Q, Dan Silver commented that the band had given "angst-ridden rock... an effective electronic spin". Johan Wippsson from Melodic complimented Don Gilmore's production and described Hybrid Theory as "destructive and angry but always with a well controlled melodic feeling all over." The Village Voices Robert Christgau gave the album a two-star honorable mention rating and cited "Papercut" and "Points of Authority" as highlights; he quipped, "the men don't know what the angry boys understand".

In a more critical assessment, William Ruhlmann of AllMusic found that on Hybrid Theory, Linkin Park sound "like a Johnny-come-lately to an already overdone musical style." NME critic Noel Gardner said that it was a "decent" album in need of editing, writing that "otherwise damn fine soaring emo-crunchers like 'With You' and 'A Place for My Head' are pointlessly jazzed up with tokenistic scratching". Rolling Stones Matt Diehl felt that the album "works in spots" and the band "knows its way around a hook", but panned Bennington and Shinoda's "corny, boilerplate-aggro lyrics".

Reviewing Hybrid Theory in 2006, Tyler Fisher of Sputnikmusic perceived a lack of musical variety on the record, but concluded that it "stands as a defining mainstream album at the turn of the century, and for good reason." Writing for Stylus Magazine the following year, Ian Cohen found that while the album is "almost completely forgettable" outside of its singles, it "was strangely fresh for mainstream rock radio, particularly placed in relief of its ugly post-grunge peers and the staunch revivalism of the Strokes/White Stripes front." Pitchforks Gabriel Szatan was more enthusiastic in a 2020 review; he wrote that "all the band's sharpest tendencies meshed and their less attractive aesthetic impulses were suppressed" on Hybrid Theory, while crediting the band with helping to normalize discussion of mental health "within pop, rock, rap, and every genre along the heavy axis". Luke Morton of Kerrang! argued that it is "not hyperbolic to say that Hybrid Theory is one of the most important rock albums of all time."

Accolades
At the 44th Grammy Awards in 2002, Linkin Park won Best Hard Rock Performance for their song "Crawling". Additional nominations for Best New Artist and Best Rock Album lost out to Alicia Keys and All That You Can't Leave Behind by U2. Hybrid Theory found itself in several "must have" lists that were compiled by various music publications, networks, and other media. In 2012, Rock Sound named Hybrid Theory the best modern classic album of the last 15 years. In 2013, Loudwire ranked it at No. 10 in its Best Hard Rock Debut Albums list. Some of the more prominent of these lists to feature Hybrid Theory are shown below:

* denotes an unordered list

Commercial performance
Hybrid Theory debuted at number 16 on the US Billboard 200, selling 50,000 copies in its first week. It was certified gold by the Recording Industry Association of America (RIAA) five weeks after its release. In 2001, the album had sold 4.8 million copies in the United States, making it the best-selling album of the year, and it was estimated that the album continued selling 100,000 copies per week in early 2002. Throughout the following years, the album continued to sell at a fast pace and was eventually certified Diamond by the Recording Industry Association of America in 2005 for shipment of ten million copies in the United States; in 2017, it was awarded another level of platinum status for a total of 11× Platinum. In 2001 the album was the second best-selling album globally, selling 8.5 million copies. To date, the album has sold 27 million copies worldwide, which makes it the best selling debut album of the 21st century. As of September 2020, the album has been certified 12x Platinum (Diamond) and has sold 10.5 million copies in the United States per Nielsen SoundScan.

After the death of Bennington on July 20, 2017, the album reached number 1 on the iTunes and Amazon music charts. It also re-entered at #27 on the Billboard 200, along with three of their other studio albums, re-surfacing into the top 10 at #8 the following week. In the UK, it peaked at No. 4 in 2001 and re-climbed to its peak position in July 2017, the same week it re-entered the top 10 in the US. The album also charted in 11 other countries at fairly high positions and ranked among the top ten in the charts of the United Kingdom, Sweden, New Zealand, Austria, Finland, and Switzerland.

Hybrid Theory was the 11th best performing album on the Billboard 200 during the decade, the album reached the top ten in its 38th week on the chart and stayed in the top ten for 34 weeks. The album spent nearly 170 weeks on the chart as of 2017, by re-entering at No. 167 in February 2011 and for several weeks every time a new studio album was released.

Later in 2002, Linkin Park released the remix album Reanimation. It included the songs of Hybrid Theory remixed and reinterpreted by nu metal and underground hip hop artists. Contributors to the album included Black Thought, Pharoahe Monch, Jonathan Davis, Stephen Carpenter, and Aaron Lewis. The sound of later Linkin Park albums would involve experimentation with classical instruments such as strings and piano, both of which, along with the same elements of electronica from Hybrid Theory, are prominently included in the band's second studio album Meteora. As Shinoda explains the difference in the sound between Hybrid Theory and Meteora: "That electronic element has always been there in the band – it's just that sometimes we bring it closer to the front."

Singles 
According to Billboard, as of 2022, Hybrid Theory is one of the 15 best-performing 21st-century albums without any of its singles being number-one hits on the Billboard Hot 100. Hybrid Theory was released in the United States on October 24, 2000, following radio airplay of "One Step Closer". Four singles from the album were released throughout 2001 (though "Points of Authority" was released as a promotional single), three of which were chart successes on the US Billboard Modern Rock Tracks charts. The single "In the End" was the highest-charting single from the album, which peaked at No. 1 on the Modern Rock Tracks charts and appearing on charts worldwide. The success of "In the End" was partly responsible for Hybrid Theorys chart success; it reached No. 2 in the Billboard 200 in 2002.

20th anniversary edition

In preparation of the 20th anniversary of the release of the album, the band asked their fans to submit pictures and videos in relation to Hybrid Theory in celebration of the 20th anniversary. On August 7, the band's official website went under a temporary redesign resembling an early 2000s computer theme, leaving behind clues and puzzles hidden within the website hinting at a re-release of the album, including old emails, pictures, and codes. The website was updated frequently leading up to the announcement of the 20th anniversary re-release on August 13; a previously unreleased song, "She Couldn't" was released on the same day.

Pre-orders for the album went live with announcement of the contents of its release. It contains various content from the Hybrid Theory era, including the original album, the band's remix album Reanimation, Hybrid Theory EP, and various B-sides, demos, live tracks, and remixes. Most of the tracks have been previously released on singles, extended plays, and via the Linkin Park Underground fan club, while other tracks are being released for the first time on this compilation. Various editions of the release were offered, including on CDs and vinyl. It was released on October 9, 2020.

In addition to the music, the super deluxe edition of the release includes additional bonus content including three DVDs, art prints, and an 80-page book which includes never before seen pictures. One of the three DVDs was previously released on November 20, 2001, during the promotion of Hybrid Theory, documenting the band's time on the road, titled Frat Party at the Pankake Festival. The other two DVDs were exclusively released for the first time on the super deluxe edition.

A digital counterpart of the compilation was also released, including the music only, containing a total of 80 tracks.

 Track listing 
Original release

20th anniversary edition
The 20th anniversary edition includes the original album (in CD, vinyl and digital) on disc one.

 Hybrid Theory – Live Around the World Hybrid Theory – Live Around the World'' is a live album which features live versions of eight songs from the first studio album, Hybrid Theory. They were recorded in various cities around the world from 2007 to 2010. The album was released exclusively on iTunes.

 Track listing 

Personnel
Credits adapted from AllMusic for original release only.Linkin Park Chester Bennington – vocals
 Rob Bourdon – drums, percussion
 Brad Delson – guitars; bass guitar (3-8, 12)
 Joe Hahn – turntables, samples, synthesizers, artwork
 Mike Shinoda – co-lead and rap vocals, keyboards, programming, samples, rhythm guitar on "Crawling" and "Pushing Me Away", piano on "My December", artwork and productionAdditional musicians Ian Hornbeck – bass (on "Papercut", "A Place for My Head", and "Forgotten")
 Scott Koziol – bass (on "One Step Closer")
 The Dust Brothers – sequencing, and samples (on "With You")Production Don Gilmore – producer, engineering
 Steve Sisco – engineering
 John Ewing Jr. – additional engineering, Pro Tools
 Matt Griffin – engineering assistance
 Andy Wallace – mixing
 Brian Gardner – audio mastering, digital editing
 Jeff Blue – executive producerArtwork'''
Frank Maddocks – graphic design
James Minchin III – photography

Charts

Weekly charts

Hybrid Theory (20th anniversary edition)

Year-end charts

Decade-end charts

Certifications

References

External links

2000 debut albums
Rap metal albums
Linkin Park albums
Warner Records albums
Hard rock albums by American artists